Aircargo Communities Inc, also known as Air Cargo Inc,  is a network of air freight cartage agents and trucking companies providing services to airlines and freight forwarders in North America. This network was established in 1941 during World War II by major US carriers including United, American, TWA, and Eastern to accommodate their ground transportation needs.

Air Cargo Inc publishes the Air Freight Directory, also known as the "ACI Guide".

References

Logistics companies of the United States
Companies based in San Francisco
Transportation companies based in California